Blanca is the first studio album by Blanca. Word Records released the album on May 4, 2015.

Critical reception

Andy Argyrakis, awarding the album four stars at CCM Magazine, states, "the self-titled long player seamlessly switches between pop, hip hop and the dance floor, all adorned with the latest production trends, plus perhaps most importantly, fear-shattering and faith-fueling lyrics gleaned from autobiographical inspiration." Signaling in a three star review by Jesus Freak Hideout, Christopher Smith writes, "Blanca's beautiful voice and diverse collection of styles make the first few listens exciting, but several more spins reveal that the album is less memorable than those initial impressions suggest." Mark Ryan, indicating in a three and a half star review from New Release Tuesday, says, "it did not push the limits as far as I was hoping, but there's plenty here to love."

Michael Dalton, rating the album three and a half out of five for The Phantom Tollbooth, describes, "This is a fine debut...that stands on the shoulders of artists, some previously mentioned, who have given us some of the best music this world has ever heard." Giving the album a 3.8 out of five at Christian Music Review, Laura Chambers states, "This album will bolster your faith and provide discouragement-busting anthems for any struggle you face." Joshua Andre, awarding the album four stars from 365 Days of Inspiring Media, says, the "new album is something to be celebrated as it marks the beginning of a new chapter, with plenty of new hits and potential singles".

Track listing

Charts

References

2015 albums
Word Records albums
Blanca (musician) albums
Christian electronic dance music albums